Tremaine Stewart (5 January 1988 – 18 April 2021) was a Jamaican professional footballer who played as a forward or winger.

Club career
Nicknamed 'Tan Tan', he began his career in his native homeland, playing for August Town and Portmore United in Jamaica National Premier League, before he transferred to Aalesund and Tippeligaen prior to the 2012 season.

On 25 March 2012, he made his first league appearance for Aalesund coming on as a substitute against Stabæk. He later scored his first goal for Aalesund against Haugesund on 16 May 2012 in his fifth league appearance for the club. He scored goals in both Aalesund's Europa League wins against KF Tirana.

The latter half of the 2012 season was bright for the Jamaican. On 29 July, he scored his second league goal for the club in the home 3–1 win against Stabæk, while he scored two times in an away win against Fredrikstad FK. This was Aalesund's first away win in 14 months.

During July 2014, Stewart left Aalesund returning to Jamaica. Just over a year later, Stewart returned to Northern Europe, signing for Veikkausliiga side RoPS on a one-year contract.

On his return to Jamaica, he played again for Portmore United and Waterhouse before joining Dunbeholden in summer 2020.

International career
On 24 February 2012, he made his international debut against Cuba coming on as a substitute. He made his first start and scored his first goal (Jamaica's second goal) in a 3–2 win over New Zealand on 29 February 2012.

Death
Stewart died suddenly and unexpectedly on the morning of 18 April 2021, after collapsing while playing in Spanish Town. Despite being brought to the nearest hospital, he could not be resuscitated.

Career statistics

References

External links
 

1988 births
2021 deaths
Sportspeople from Kingston, Jamaica
Association football forwards
Jamaican footballers
Jamaica international footballers
August Town F.C. players
Portmore United F.C. players
Aalesunds FK players
Waterhouse F.C. players
Rovaniemen Palloseura players
National Premier League players
Eliteserien players
Veikkausliiga players
Jamaican expatriate footballers
Expatriate footballers in Norway
Jamaican expatriate sportspeople in Norway
Expatriate footballers in Finland
Jamaican expatriate sportspeople in Finland
Association football players who died while playing
Accidental deaths in Jamaica
Dunbeholden F.C. players